Bojan Marović (born 21 May 1984) is a Montenegrin singer and actor. He is from Podgorica where he resides.

Biography
Bojan was born to parents Darko (1963–2001) and Sanja (1967). On April 7, 2001, his father Darko (1963–2001) died at age 38. On his 18th birthday, his mother, Sanja, Darko's widow, gave him his song "Više te nema", which won him third place in the Sunčane Skale festival. He has a younger brother, Boris, who is Bojan's inspiration, according to an interview.

Discography
 Krio sam  (2004)
 Litar neba (A litre of the sky) (2007)
 Za tebe i mene ("For you and me") (2011)

Singles
 Svaki korak tvoj (Pjesma Mediterana 2010)

Filmography
Imam nešto važno da vam kažem (2005)

External links
Official Website
Official youtube Channel

21st-century Montenegrin male singers
Musicians from Podgorica
1984 births
Living people
Indexi Award winners
Actors from Podgorica